Estonia team have competed at the Special Olympics World Games since after regaining independence in 1991 and have won over 100 medals at the games.

Medal tallies

Special Olympics World Summer Games

Best performances in bold.

Gold medalists
 2007 Special Olympics World Summer Games
 Kalle Noorkõiv: Aquatics (swimming) Division M20 – Men's 100 metre freestyle 2.03,74
 Anu Säär: Aquatics (swimming) Division F09 – Women's 50 metre freestyle 1.02,85
 Ragne Kändla: Aquatics (swimming) Division F01 – Women's 100 metre freestyle 1.58,16
 Viljar Koppel: Athletics/Track & Field Division M19 – Men's 400 metre run 1.12,57
 2003 Special Olympics World Summer Games
 Riho Saar: Aquatics (swimming), Age Group: 16- 21, Division M35 – Men's 50 metre freestyle
 Arvo Sõerd: Athletics/Track & Field – Men's 400 metre run
 Estonian team (Gristel Markus, Arvo Sõerd, Angela Siim, Taivo Sõts): Athletics/Track & Field  – 4x100 metre run
 1991 Special Olympics World Summer Games
 Joel Zoova: Athletics/Track & Field

Silver medalists
 2007 Special Olympics World Summer Games
 Viljar Koppel: Athletics/Track & Field Division M09 – Men's long jump 4.26
 Raivo Laar: Athletics/Track & Field Division M07 – Men's 400 metre Run 1.01,92
 Marge Vaino: Athletics/Track & Field Division F04 – Women's 800 metre run 2.48,72
 Marge Vaino: Athletics/Track & Field Division F02 – Women's long jump 3.52
 2003 Special Olympics World Summer Games
 Arvo Sõerd: Athletics/Track & Field, Age Group: 8- 11, Division M20 – Men's long jump
 1995 Special Olympics World Summer Games
 Andrei Golovin: Powerlifting
 1991 Special Olympics World Summer Games
 Arnold Oksmaa: Gymnastics 
 Estonian team (Arnold Oksmaa 2. place Sten Meriväli 4. place): Gymnastics

Bronze medalists
 2007 Special Olympics World Summer Games
 Raivo Laar: Athletics/Track & Field Division M03 – Men's 1500 metre run 5.21,76
 Jüri Kändla: Aquatics (swimming) Division M02 – Men's 50 metre freestyle 49,88
 Kalle Noorkõiv: Aquatics (swimming) Division M17 – Men's 50 metre freestyle 43,50
 Team Estonia (Jüri Kändla, Kalle Noorkõiv, Anu Säär, Ragne Kändla): Aquatics (swimming) Division M4 – 4X25 metre freestyle relay 1.26,78
 2003 Special Olympics World Summer Games
 Annika Holtsmann: Aquatics (swimming), Age Group: 16- 21, Division F10 – Women's 50 metre freestyle
 Angela Siim: Athletics/Track & Field, Age Group: 16- 21, Division F01 – Women's 1500 metre run
 Taivo Sõts: Athletics/Track & Field, Age Group: 16- 21, Division M01 – Men's shot put

Special Olympics World Winter Games

Best performances in bold.

Gold medalists
2005 Special Olympics World Winter Games
 Allar Sonn: Cross country skiing – Men's 1 km freestyle
 Arbo Skobiej: Cross country skiing – Men's 5 km individual
 Enno Rakojed: Cross country skiing – Men's 5 km freestyle 20.34,50
 Estonian team (Enno Rakojed, Arbo Skobiej, Raigo Moor, Gustav Rannamets): Cross country skiing – Men's 4x1 km freestyle 16.12,0
2001 Special Olympics World Winter Games
 Jannes Aasorg, Gennadi Grudkin, Airet Lohu, Urmas Simus, Marina Västrik, Eda King, Eerika Sõrmus and Kadi Kurn.
1997 Special Olympics World Winter Games
 Erki Elmik: Cross country skiing – Men's 3 km freestyle
 Liina Vingel: Cross country skiing – Women's  km freestyle
 Thule Kariste
 Rainer Danilov

Silver medalists
2005 Special Olympics World Winter Games
 Sven Paulus: Cross country skiing – Men's 1 km freestyle
 Gustav Rannamets: Cross country skiing – Men's 3 km freestyle 12.29,60
 Raigo Moor: Cross country skiing – Men's 5 km freestyle 21.16,00
1997 Special Olympics World Winter Games
 Anu Säär: Cross country skiing – Women's 1 km freestyle
 Estonian team (Erki Elmik, Marek Sepp, Eiko Hallkivi): Cross country skiing – Men's 3x1 km freestyle

Bronze medalists
2005 Special Olympics World Winter Games
 Enno Rakojed: Cross country skiing – Men's 3 km freestyle 13.22,70
1997 Special Olympics World Winter Games
 Rene Ridal: Cross country skiing – Men's 1 km freestyle
 Marek Sepp: Cross country skiing – Men's 3 km freestyle

See also
President and honorary patron of the Special Olympics Estonia
Tõnu Karu – 1989–1997
Toomas Hendrik Ilves – 1997–2004 (now Honorary President)
Honorary patron since 2004: Jaak Jõerüüt 
Estonia at the Olympics
Estonia at the Paralympics

References

External links
 Special Olympics
Special Olympics Estonia
Team Estonia at 2007 Special Olympics World Summer Games 

Special Olympics World Games
Special Olympics